Non troppo presto, sometimes alternatively entitled Music for the Dance No. 1, refers to an untitled composition for piano by American composer Leonard Bernstein, written in 1937.

Background 

This is an untitled composition written by Bernstein to Mildred Spiegel Zucker, a music teacher which was a childhood friend of Bernstein. It was presumably written for his birthday, perhaps as a birthday present. The piece was completed on June 12, 1937, and the first known performance took place exactly one year later, on June 12, 1938, at the studio of Heinrich Gebhard, in Brookline, Massachusetts. Since Bernstein also wrote another composition for piano on the occasion of Mildred's birthday one year later which was entitled Music for the Dance No. 2, this has led publishers to believe that this composition could be the Music for the Dance No. 1. However, this has not been confirmed by Bernstein's correspondence with the dedicatee. After completion and possible subsequent revision, the manuscript was abandoned and rediscovered many years after the composer's death in the Leonard Bernstein Archive at the Library of Congress. Though it was initially edited in 1937, it was published in 2010 by Amberson Holdings, the Leonard Bernstein Music Publishing Company and Boosey & Hawkes.

Structure 

Since the manuscript of this piece was found untitled in the archive, Non troppo presto takes its title from the tempo marking at the beginning. It has a total of 45 bars (or 54 with repetitions) and a duration of two to three minutes. Leonard Bernstein wrote two inscriptions in the manuscript: "for Mildred, 21" at the top and "with all my heart—L.B." at the end.

Non troppo presto has a rhythmically marked character where two-part textures largely predominate. The harmonies presented in the piece are generally harsher and more brittle than in other later works, and the diatonic lyricism that he would later develop in some of his most popular works is mostly missing.

Recordings 

Given the fact that Non troppo presto was published relatively recently, recordings are not very well known and are typically released within cycles of complete music for piano by Bernstein. Here is a list of recordings of this composition:

 Alexander Dossin gave the world premiere recording with Naxos. The recording was taken some time between January 3 and 5 and March 24 and 26, 2014, at the Beall Concert Hall in the University of Oregon, in Eugene, Oregon. The recording was released in 2015.
 Leann Osterkamp also recorded the piece with Steinway & Sons in a collection of complete solo piano works by Bernstein. The piece was recorded at the Steinway Hall in New York City and was released on compact disc on September 15, 2017.
 Andrew Cooperstock recorded the piece with Bridge Records. The recording was also released on compact disc in 2017, in a compilation of works for piano by the composer.
 Katie Mahan recorded the piece for a Deutsche Grammophon release of Bernstein's full oeuvre. The recording was taken on November 25 and 26, 2017, at the Meistersaal, in Berlin. The recording was released first as a compilation of solo piano works by Bernstein and then as a compilation of all complete works by Bernstein, both in 2018.
 Michele Tozzetti recorded the piece under Piano Classics. The recording was made between December 8 and 10, 2017, at the Musicafelix - Studio Benelli Mosell, in Prato, Italy. It was released on compact disc on May 24, 2019.

Notes

References

See also 

 Music for the Dance No. 2

1937 compositions
Compositions by Leonard Bernstein
Compositions for solo piano